Nepal does not recognize same-sex marriages, civil unions, domestic partnerships, or any other form of recognition for same-sex couples. In 2011 and 2012, as the country was undergoing a political transition, there was an attempt to add LGBT-inclusive language to the proposed constitution. However, negotiations among political factions failed in spring 2012 and the drafting of a new constitution was placed on hold until new elections were held. A constitution was approved by the Constituent Assembly on 16 September 2015, and while it includes several provisions pertaining to the rights of LGBT people, it does not address same-sex marriages.

Foreign same-sex spouses of Nepali citizens are eligible for a "Non-Tourist Visa" as a dependant, following a 2017 ruling by the Supreme Court of Nepal.

Legal history
Same-sex marriage is not recognized in Nepal, despite attempts at legalisation in the past. In 2008, the Supreme Court made Nepal one of the first Asian countries to consider legalizing same-sex marriage, but attempts to include provisions recognizing same-sex marriage in the new constitution in 2015 were unsuccessful.

Court cases

Sunil Babu Pant and Others v. Nepal Government
On November 17, 2008, the Nepali Supreme Court ruled in favor of laws to guarantee full rights to LGBT people and define gender minorities as "natural persons" under the law, including the right to marry. "This is a landmark decision for sexual minorities and we welcome it," said Sunil Babu Pant, Nepal's first publicly gay lawmaker and a leading gay rights activist in South Asia. The court asked the government to form a committee to study same-sex partnership laws in other countries and mandated that the new law not discriminate against sexual minorities, including transgender people.

On March 22, 2009, Pant said in an interview with the Indo-Asian News Service that "Though the court has approved of same-sex marriage, the government is yet to enact a law," signaling that while a same-sex marriage bill has been ordered by the Supreme Court, it has yet to be drafted or voted on, much less legislated. In June 2009, Pant said the process has just started: "Nepal is going through transition and everything seems to move slowly. The seven-member committee has formed and just started working to study same-sex marriage bills in other countries. Hopefully they will draft the suggestion to make same-sex marriage law soon and give it to the government to approve."

Rajani Shahi v. National Women's Commission
In 2012, the Supreme Court recognized the relationship of a lesbian couple in Rajani Shahi v. National Women's Commission. The court allowed Rajani Shahi to live with her partner Prem Kumari Nepali as she wished, rather than with her husband. The verdict stated: "Individuals can decide as to choosing their ways of living either separately or in partnership together with homosexuals or heterosexuals – with or without solemnizing marriage. Although in the prevailing laws and tradition "marriage" denotes legal bond between heterosexuals (male and female), the legal provisions on the homosexual relations are either inadequate or mute [sic] by now."

Suman Panta v. Ministry of Home Affairs et. al.
Leslie Luin Melnik, an American citizen, married Suman Panta, a Nepalese citizen, in December 2015 in California. Melnik applied for a "Non-Tourist Visa" ("NT Visa") with the Department of Immigration (DOIM) in December 2016 as the dependant of a Nepalese citizen. The DOIM denied Melnik's application on the ground that Nepali law does not recognize same-sex marriage. The couple filed a lawsuit with the Supreme Court requiring the DOIM to issue an NT Visa to Melnik. The court issued its judgement on 23 October 2017, ruling that under Rule 8(1)(h) of the Immigration Rules a foreign national who submits a valid marriage license with a Nepali citizen is eligible to obtain an "NT Visa" as a dependant. The Supreme Court further ruled that the Immigration Rules do not specify that a foreign national applying for an NT Visa must either be of the same or opposite gender. It also ruled that Panta, as a member of a "gender and sexual minority", is entitled to the fundamental right to live a life with dignity without discrimination under the Constitution of Nepal. Foreign same-sex spouses of Nepali citizens are now eligible to obtain an NT Visa as a dependant.

2015 Constitution
Several sources reported that same-sex marriage and protections for sexual minorities would be included in the new constitution being drafted. The Interim Constitution provided for a Constituent Assembly, which was charged with writing a permanent constitution. Under the terms of the Interim Constitution, the new constitution was to be promulgated by November 30, 2011, but a final six month extension was granted just before this deadline bringing the date to May 31, 2012. Negotiations failed and Prime Minister Baburam Bhattarai dissolved the Constituent Assembly on May 28, 2012 in preparations for the 2013 elections. As a result, the future of same-sex marriage was uncertain.

The elections were held on 19 November 2013. The vote was repeatedly delayed, having previously been planned for 22 November 2012 following the dissolution of the Constituent Assembly on 27 May 2012, but it was put off by the Election Commission. On 10 February 2014, Sushil Koirala was elected as prime minister with a large majority, breaking the political deadlock and opening the way for the constitution to be finalised.

The Constitution of Nepal, approved in 2015, does not address the issue of same-sex marriage. Nonetheless, Article 18 lists "gender and sexual minorities" among recognized and protected disadvantaged groups.

Legislation

In January 2014, Chaitanya Mishra, a member of the committee formed to study international laws on same-sex marriage, stated that work on the report had been completed, except for a summary to be drafted by the chairman of the committee. The chairman, Laxmi Raj Pathak, promised to submit the report to the Nepali Government within a month, but said that the government was "not interested in the matter". Bhumika Shrestha of the Blue Diamond Society, a Nepalese gay rights group, said he was not ruling out the possibility of another lawsuit with the Supreme Court.

In August 2014, the Associated Press reported that the committee had decided to recommend the legalization of same-sex marriage. The same month, the Minister of Justice, Narahari Acharya, said that his ministry would present a bill to allow same-sex marriages. The committee submitted its report to the government on 9 February 2015, and in January 2016, a government official stated that the recommendations of the committee were under consultation. In February 2016, the National Human Rights Commission asked the government to introduce a bill to allow same-sex marriage. In October 2016, the Ministry of Women, Children and Social Welfare created a committee for the purpose of preparing a draft bill on the issue. In August 2018, former Prime Minister Baburam Bhattarai urged the government to legalise same-sex marriage.

The Marriage Registration Act, 1971, as well as the National Code of Nepal, enacted in August 2018, define marriage as the union of "a male and a female". While the Civil Code was under discussion, the government requested the legislative committee in charge of drafting the code that provisions addressing same-sex marriage be omitted. Activists called this out as unconstitutional and contrary to Supreme Court guidelines. A spokesman said that the government intended to pass a separate law on same-sex marriage, currently being drafted by the Ministry of Women, Children and Social Welfare.

On 1 July 2020, the National Human Rights Commission called on the government to legalize same-sex marriage.

Individual marriage ceremonies
In 2011, a lesbian couple held a traditional Hindu marriage ceremony at the Dakshinkali Temple near Kathmandu, but the marriage has no legal status in Nepal.

In July 2017, a couple, Monica Shahi and Ramesh Nath, successfully registered their marriage in Parshuram in the far-western Dadeldhura District. Shahi is a third gender person, with their sex recorded as "other" on their official identity documents. LGBT activist Sunil Babu Pant congratulated the married couple. Home Ministry spokesman Deepak Kafle said that the marriage could be invalid.

See also
 LGBT rights in Nepal
 Recognition of same-sex unions in Asia

Notes

References

External links
 Writ No. 917 of the year 2064 BS (2007 AD)
 Supreme Court Decision - summary note
 

LGBT rights in Nepal
Nepal
Marriage in Nepal